Boxwood Cemetery is a historic rural cemetery located at Medina in Orleans County, New York. The cemetery was established in 1849, and is the resting place of many early settlers.  The cemetery includes approximately 5,000 marked burials in the cemetery, spanning from 1849 until the present day.  It features entrance ways flanked by Medina sandstone columns and wrought-iron gates built in 1925.  Located in the cemetery is a Gothic Revival style chapel built in 1903 of rough-cut red Medina sandstone.

It was listed on the National Register of Historic Places in 2015.

Boxwood is about 20 acres of land. It is located at the northwestern edge of the Village of Medina. Though portions of the cemetery are also in the Town of Ridgeway, the Village of Medina owns and operates the cemetery.

Notable burials 
 Silas Mainville Burroughs (1810–1860), US Congressman

Gallery

References

External links

 

Cemeteries on the National Register of Historic Places in New York (state)
1849 establishments in New York (state)
Gothic Revival church buildings in New York (state)
Buildings and structures in Orleans County, New York
National Register of Historic Places in Orleans County, New York
Rural cemeteries